Cuiciuna is a genus of longhorn beetles of the subfamily Lamiinae, containing the following species:

 Cuiciuna amoenoides (Fisher, 1938)
 Cuiciuna fumigata (Germar, 1824)
 Cuiciuna iuati Galileo & Martins, 1997
 Cuiciuna melancholica (Melzer, 1931)
 Cuiciuna rectilinea (Bates, 1881)

References

Hemilophini